Aparajitha Raja (born 24 January 1991) is an Indian politician and was the National leader of the All India Students’ Federation. She was the president of the Jawaharlal Nehru University unit of the AISF. She is currently serving as a National Council member of All India Youth Federation. She is the daughter of D. Raja, the Communist Party of India’s (CPI) General secretary and Annie Raja the General secretary of the National Federation of Indian Women.

References

Living people
Jawaharlal Nehru University alumni
21st-century Indian politicians
Female politicians of the Communist Party of India
Communist Party of India politicians from Delhi
1991 births
21st-century Indian women politicians